The 1995 Rugby League World Cup squads were made up of players from the national rugby league football teams of ten countries: Australia, England, Fiji, France, New Zealand, Papua New Guinea, South Africa, Tonga, Wales and Western Samoa.

Australia
Due to the Super League war, the Australian Rugby League did not select any player who had signed with Super League. As 100% of Australia's squad was sourced from Australian Rugby League-aligned players, several test players from the successful 1994 Kangaroo Tour were not selected for the World Cup, though a number of the team had played in the 3-0 Trans-Tasman Test series win over New Zealand earlier in the year.

Super League aligned Canberra Raiders players, including Laurie Daley, Ricky Stuart took the ARL to court during 1995 in a bid to be able to play in the World Cup. The court found in their favour and ordered the ARL to consider all players for selection regardless of who they were aligned to. However, as one unnamed ARL official was quoted as saying, the ARL were only forced to consider Super League players, not select them. Just how many, if any, Super League players were considered for selection remains unknown and speculation remains that behind closed doors no Super League player was considered.

Coach:  Bob Fulton
Manager: Geoff Carr 
 

*Gary Larson originally declined selection citing personal reasons. When Paul Harragon was injured he answered Bob Fulton's call to join the squad and ended up playing in the final at Wembley.

England
Long time Wigan, Great Britain and England back rower Denis Betts, playing for the Auckland Warriors in the Australian Rugby League premiership, made history by becoming the first player selected to captain England while not playing for a British club.

Coach:  Phil Larder

Fiji
Coach:  Graham Murray

France
Coach:  Ivan Grésèque

New Zealand
Coach:  Frank Endacott

Papua New Guinea
Coach:  Joe Tokam

South Africa
Coach:  Tony Fisher

Tonga
Coach:  Mike McClennan

Luke Leilua, Angelo Dymock, Mateaki Mafi, Frank Watene and Andrew Tangata-Toa were all named in the squad but did not play a game.
Tonga were hit with the withdrawals of Jim Dymock and John Hopoate, who were both included in the Australian squad, and Gorden Tallis and Albert Fulivai, who both withdrew due to injury.

Wales
Coach:  Clive Griffiths

Western Samoa
Coach:  Graham Lowe

References

External links
1995 Rugby League World Cup Squads rugbyleagueproject.org
1995 Rugby League World Cup Squads The Vault

Squads
Rugby League World Cup squads